Zdravko Kajmaković (Serbian: Здравко Кајмаковић) (10 October 1929 in Modran, Bijeljina – 19 March 2009, in Sarajevo) was an art historian and ranks among the leading scholars of the latter half of the twentieth century in Bosnia and Herzegovina. He was one of pioneers and founding figures in professional and academic circles, unrivalled in the field of heritage protection, the history of art, conservation and restoration, and the organization and execution of major, complex projects and actions. In his day, he was at the very forefront of Bosnian and Herzegovian culture, as well as Serbian culture and science.

References

1929 births
2009 deaths
Bosnia and Herzegovina art historians